Federal judge salaries in the United States are determined by the United States Congress and are governed in part by the United States Constitution, depending in part on the court on which the judge sits. In particular, United States federal judges confirmed under Article III of the Constitution have compensation that "shall not be diminished during their continuance in office." Other federal judges have salaries that may be adjusted without direct constitutional constraints, however statutory schemes usually govern these salaries. Debates over judicial salaries and their increase and treatment have occurred since the ratification of the Constitution.

Compensation varies based upon the particular judgeship, though it generally increases commensurate with the office.

Article III judges
Article III federal judges are those appointed under Article III, Section 1 of the U.S Constitution. Due to the Compensation Clause, these judges are federal judges that may not have their salaries diminished during their time in office, and are appointed to indefinite terms and may not be removed unless they resign or are impeached.

Supreme Court
The United States Supreme Court is the highest federal appellate court. Its members are commonly called justices.

The following table lists annual salary increases for the justices from 1789 to present.

Appeals Court
The following is a list of salaries for judges on the United States Court of Appeals.

District Court
The following is a table of district judge salaries in the United States. District judge salaries varied based on the state prior to 1891. They were unified in 1891.

Court of International Trade

According to the Federal Judiciary Center, Court of International Trade judges receive the same salary as district court judges.

Non Article III judges

Magistrate judges
Since 1988, the salary of magistrate judges is set by the Judicial Conference of the United States, but may not exceed 92 percent of the salary of district court judges.

Bankruptcy judges
Since 1988, bankruptcy judges receive compensation equal to 92 percent of the salary of district judges.

Administrative Law Judges 
United States Administrative Law Judges (U.S. ALJs) are individuals appointed under 5 U.S.C. 3105 for administrative proceedings conducted in accordance with 5 U.S.C. 556 and 557. ALJs are paid under 5 U.S.C. 5372.

The ALJ pay system has three levels of basic pay: AL-1, AL-2, and AL-3. The base pay for each step varies according to the location of the position. The rate of basic pay for AL-3, rate A, may not be less than 65 percent of the rate of basic pay for level IV of the Executive Schedule. The rate of basic pay for AL-1 may not exceed the rate for level IV of the Executive Schedule.

ALJs also receive locality payments under 5 U.S.C. 5304.  Locality rates for ALJs may not exceed the rate for level III of the Executive Schedule.

An ALJ who is appointed and placed in level AL-3 must be paid at the minimum rate A, unless the ALJ is eligible for a higher rate because of prior service or superior qualifications. Level AL-3 has 5 rates and it takes a total of 7 years to advanced from ALJ-3A to ALJ-3F.

As of 2022, the pay for ALJ-3, including locality adjustments, ranges from $136,651.00 per year to $187,300.00 depending on the particular locality and advancement from rate A to F.  As of 2022, pay for ALJ-2 and ALJ-1 is capped at $187,300.00 based on salary compression caused by salary caps based on the Executive Schedule.

Tax Court judges
Judges of the Tax Court receive the same compensation as district court judges.

Court of Federal Claims judges
Since 1988, judges of the Court of Federal Claims receive the same compensation as district court judges.

Court of Appeals for the Armed Forces
Judges of the Court of Appeals for the Armed Forces receive the same compensation as judges of the circuit courts of appeals.

Court of Appeals for Veterans Claims
Judges of the Court of Appeals for Veterans Claims receive the same compensation as district court judges.

United States Court of Private Land Claims

United States Court for Berlin

Territorial judges
Territorial Courts are created under Article IV and exist in U.S. Territories. Only three currently exist. Compensation is fixed at the rate of regular district court judges.

Hybrid courts and others

District of Columbia courts

United States Commerce Court
The United States Commerce Court sat from 1910 to 1913. It had a staggered and limited-term membership, but consisted of Article III Appellate Court judges that would be at-large judges when not on the Court.

United States Court of Claims
The United States Court of Claims was a court that served from 1855 to 1982. It existed as both an Article I and Article III court (after 1953).

Court of Customs and Patent Appeals
The Court of Customs and Patent Appeals was a court sitting from 1909 to 1982. Its treatment as an Article I or Article III court is ambiguous; it was originally ruled an Article I court, however it was later ruled an Article III court after Congress amended the law creating it.

See also
 Judicial independence

References

Notes

External links
 
 

United States law-related lists
United States federal courts
United States judicial salaries
Salaries of office-holders
US Federal judge